"Seven Against the Wall" is an episode of the American anthology series Playhouse 90. It was about the Saint Valentine's Day Massacre.

Cast
 Paul Lambert as Al Capone
 Dennis Patrick as George 'Bugs' Moran
 Frank Silvera as Nick Sorrello
 Paul Stevens as Jack 'Machine Gun Jack' McGurn
 Dennis Cross as Pete 'Goosey' Gusenberg
 Barry Cahill as Frank 'Tight Lips' Gusenberg
 Richard Carlyle as Reinhardt Schwimmer
 Al Ruscio as Albert 'Gorilla Al' Weinshank
 George Keymas as James Clark
 Milton Frome  as Adam Heyer
 Wayne Heffley as John May
 Nesdon Booth as Mike 'The Pike' Heitler
 Joe de Santis as Charlie 'Trigger Happy' Fischetti
 Tige Andrews as Frank 'The Enforcer' Nitti
 Lewis Charles as Jake 'Greasy Thumb' Guzik
 Paul Burke as Paul Salvanti
 Don Gordon as 'Bobo' Borotta
 Richard Sinatra as John Scalise
 Tito Vuolo as Albert Anselmi 
 Karl Lukas as Willie Marks
 Warren Oates as Ted Ryan
 Nicholas Georgiade as Rocco
 Sid Cassel as Angelo
 Joe Abdullah as Joey
 Robert Cass as O'Meara
 Paul Maxwell as Cooley
 Arthur Hanson as Mueller
 Connie Davis as Mrs. Walsh
 Jean Inness as Mrs. Greeley
 Celia Lovsky as Mrs. Schwimmer
 Louise Fletcher as Pete's Girl
 Richard Venture as Passerby

Production
The show was based on a book by Howard Browne.

Reception
The Los Angeles Times called it "a serviceable documentary" with "some extremely effecitve moments."

The show was very popular and John Houseman claimed it helped revive the popularity of gangster films. "There hadn't been a real Al Capone gangster film for a long time and this brought them back again, both at the cinema and on television", he said.

Howard Browne later wrote other film versions of the story, including The St. Valentine's Day Massacre (1967) and Capone'' (1975).

Lawsuit
Industrialist Titus Haffa sued the show's makers for $10 million for libel and defamation complaining the show showed a headline "Titus Haffa gets two years" associating him with crime. Haffa later issued a second complaint. A person called Abe Bernstein also sued claiming the show said "Abe Bernstein" was head of The Purple Gang.

References

External links

Seven Against the Wall at Paley Centre

1958 American television episodes
1958 television plays
Playhouse 90 (season 3) episodes